In law enforcement, a sting operation is a deceptive operation designed to catch a person attempting to commit a crime. A typical sting will have an undercover law enforcement officer, detective, or co-operative member of the public play a role as criminal partner or potential victim and go along with a suspect's actions to gather evidence of the suspect's wrongdoing. Mass media journalists occasionally resort to sting operations to record video and broadcast to expose criminal activity.

Sting operations are common in many countries, such as the United States, but they are not permitted in some countries, such as Sweden or France. There are prohibitions on conducting certain types of sting operations, such as in the Philippines, where it is illegal for law enforcers to pose as drug dealers to apprehend buyers of illegal drugs.

Examples
 Offering free sports or airline tickets to lure fugitives out of hiding.
 Deploying a bait car (also called a honey trap) to catch a car thief
 Setting up a seemingly vulnerable honeypot computer to lure and gain information about hackers
 Arranging for someone under the legal drinking age to ask an adult to buy an alcoholic beverage or tobacco products for them
 Passing off weapons or explosives (whether fake or real), to a would-be terrorist
 Posing as:
 someone who is seeking illegal drugs, contraband, or child pornography, to catch a supplier (or as a supplier to catch a customer)
 a child in a chat room to identify a potential online child predator
  a potential customer of illegal prostitution, or as a prostitute to catch a would-be customer
 a hitman to catch customers and solicitors of murder-for-hire; or as a customer to catch a hitman
 a spectator of an illegal dogfighting ring
 a documentary film crew to lure a pirate to the country where a crime was committed.

Ethical and legal concerns
Sting operations are fraught with ethical concerns over whether they constitute entrapment. Law enforcement may have to be careful not to provoke the commission of a crime by someone who would not otherwise have done so. Additionally, in the process of such operations, the police often engage in the same crimes, such as buying or selling drugs, soliciting prostitutes, etc. In common law jurisdictions, the defendant may invoke the defense of entrapment.

Contrary to popular misconceptions, however, in the USA rules against entrapment do not prohibit undercover police officers from posing as criminals or denying that they are police. Entrapment is typically a defense only when suspects are pressured into being implicated in a crime they would probably not have committed otherwise, but the legal definition of this pressure varies greatly from jurisdiction to jurisdiction.

For example, if undercover officers coerced a potential suspect into manufacturing illegal drugs to sell them, the accused could use entrapment as a defense. However, if a suspect is already manufacturing drugs and police pose as buyers to catch them, entrapment usually has not occurred.

In popular culture
The term "sting" was popularized by the 1973 Robert Redford and Paul Newman movie The Sting, though the film is not about a police operation: it features two grifters and their attempts to con a mob boss out of a large sum of money.

In 1998, three agencies joined forces to conduct a sting operation where they successfully recovered the Honduras Goodwill Moon Rock from a vault in Miami. The sting operation was known as "Operation Lunar Eclipse" and the participating agencies were NASA Office of Inspector General, the United States Postal Inspection Service and U.S. Customs. The moon rock was offered to the undercover agents for  million. Journalist Christina Reed broke that story in Geotimes in 2002. Operation Lunar Eclipse and the Moon Rock Project were the subject of the book The Case of the Missing Moon Rocks by Joe Kloc.

See also
 Advance-fee scam
 ATF fictional sting operations
 The Case of the Missing Moon Rocks
 Edison divorce torture plot
 Fence (criminal)
 Honey trapping
 Honeypot (computing)
 Informant
 List of scholarly publishing stings
 Mr. Big (police procedure)
 Murder of Rachel Hoffman, the execution of a police informant during a sting operation 
 Narada Sting Operation
 Possession of stolen goods
John David Roy Atchison (1954–2007), Assistant US Attorney and children's sports coach, committed suicide in prison after being arrested in a sting operation and charged with soliciting sex from a 5-year-old girl 
 Stephen Joseph Ratkai, arrested and convicted of espionage in Canada after a successful sting operation
 The Sting

Notes

External links 
 Spencer Ackerman: Government agents 'directly involved in most high-profile US terror plots. Human Rights Watch documents 'sting' operations. Report raises questions about post-9/11 civil rights, The Guardian, 21 July 2014.

Deception operations
Law enforcement techniques